Sir George Hastings (died 4 June 1641) was an English politician who sat in the House of Commons at various times between 1614 and 1626.

Biography
Hastings was the second son of Francis Hastings, Lord Hastings and his wife Sarah Harington, daughter of Sir James Harington and Lucy Sydney. He was admitted at Sidney Sussex College, Cambridge on 2 July 1605 and at Gray's Inn on 22 March 1611. He was of Ashby-de-la-Zouch, Leicestershire and was knighted on 3 November 1619.   

In 1614 and 1621 he was elected MP for Leicestershire.  He was elected MP for Leicester in a by-election in 1625 and was re-elected MP for Leicester in 1626. 
 
Hastings died in 1641 and was buried at St Bartholomew the Great, Smithfield, London.

References

Year of birth missing
1641 deaths
Alumni of Sidney Sussex College, Cambridge
Members of Gray's Inn
People from Ashby-de-la-Zouch
English MPs 1614
English MPs 1621–1622
English MPs 1625
English MPs 1626
Members of the Parliament of England for Leicestershire